Alvaro Lojacono (born 7 May 1955) is an Italian terrorist, currently a Swiss citizen.

Biography
Lojacono was born in Rome, the son of a member of the Italian Communist Party. 

He participated in several far-left extra-parliamentary organizations in Rome, including Potere Operaio, and then became a member of the Red Brigades.

He was accused of the murder of Greek student Mikis Mantakas (28 February 1975) in front of a seat of the Italian Social Movement (a post-Fascist party) and sentenced   in absentia to 16 years of detention. 

Thanks to the Swiss citizenship of his mother, he emigrated to Switzerland where he was sentenced to 17 years of imprisonment, being freed after 11 years. He was also acquitted from any prosecution for the Moro case, because the witnesses refused to speak in front of the Swiss magistrates.

In the fourth Italian trial on the Moro affair, he was sentenced to life imprisonment (sentence confirmed on 14 May 1997).

In June 2000 he was arrested in Bastia, Corsica. He however avoided the extradition to Italy because French law does not recognize default sentences; further, Swiss law does not allow extradition for its citizens.

References

1955 births
Living people
Criminals from Rome
Red Brigades
Italian emigrants to Switzerland
Potere Operaio
Fugitives wanted on terrorism charges
Italian exiles